A neurectomy is a type of nerve block involving the severing or removal of a nerve. This surgery is performed in rare cases of severe chronic pain where no other treatments have been successful, and for other conditions such as vertigo, involuntary twitching and excessive blushing or sweating.

A brief "rehearsal" local anesthetic nerve block is usually performed before the actual neurectomy, to determine efficacy and detect side effects. The patient is typically under general anesthetic during the neurectomy, which is performed by a neurosurgeon or plastic surgeon.

Procedures

Presacral neurectomy
A presacral neurectomy is typically conducted to decrease severe pain and menstrual cramps in the lower abdomen. Pain in this region is difficult to treat with noninvasive treatments. Endometriosis is the most common cause for this severe pain. One solution that doctors often mistakenly recommend as a cure is a hysterectomy, or removal of the uterus.  However, this often does not relieve endometriosis pain because the disease is left behind on other organs such as the bladder, bowels, or pelvic side walls, and  it can thrive on its own hormone supply. Another is to perform a presacral neurectomy. This is a procedure that interrupts the nerves going towards and/or around the uterus.  Pain located on either side of the lower abdomen (but not mid line) should not be treated with a neurectomy. Only individuals with pain that is not relieved by the use of NSAIDs should consider this procedure. Techniques have been developed for this procedure to be performed laparoscopically.

The incision is typically directly under the navel. Normally three small holes are made in the lower abdomen to allow for the instruments and other various surgical tools. Nerve tissue that runs to the uterus is interrupted at the sacral promontory; a point at which spine and tailbones meet. This is the best area to access and obtain a clear view of the nerves in the uterus. Proper precautions must be taken as to avoid unnecessary complications with the major blood vessels surrounding the uterus. Some of the complications post-operation include urinary retention, as well as constipation. Neither has been reported to cause lasting effects.

Recent technological advances have allowed this same procedure to be done robotically, a minimally invasive technique similar to laparoscopy. The outcome of the procedure is identical to an open approach (laparotomy), but the incisions are much smaller allowing for less post-operation pain. Less pain following this surgery allows for a quicker recovery period too; two weeks as opposed to six weeks, on average.

Vestibular neurectomy
A vestibular neurectomy is an operation that severs the vestibular nerve, which contributes to balance, while sparing the cochlear nerve, which contributes to hearing. The procedure has the potential to relieve vertigo, but may preserve the ability to hear.  It is important to note that this procedure will not reverse the effects of deafness.  The risks include: hearing loss, tinnitus, dizziness, facial weakness, spinal fluid leak, and various infections. There are several different surgical approaches that can be used to complete this procedure: the middle cranial fossa, retrolabrynthine, retrosigmoid, and translabrynthine. The middle cranial fossa approach is one that most often requires neurosurgical expertise. The advantage of this procedure is that the vestibular nerve is clearly visible and can be sectioned without harming the cochlear nerve fibers.

The general procedure begins by positioning the patient supine with the head turned to the side with surgical ear upright. An incision is made at the lower portion of the zygomatic root to the area of the temporal region for roughly seven centimeters. Precautions are taken by clamping flaps of tissue as to not impede further actions.  To expose the IAC (Inner Auditory Canal) properly, portions of bone from the metal fundus and also the tegmen tympani must be removed. The SVN (superior vestibular nerve) is then identified and cut at the point furthest from the vestibular crest. Along with the SVN, Scarpa's ganglion is also cut and removed.

In cases of Ménière's disease, a neurectomy may be needed when no other medical treatment is sufficient for over six months. In bilateral Ménière's disease, the procedure is done on the worse-off ear. Some procedures are done on both ears, but the risk of hearing loss then becomes significantly greater.

Pulsed radiofrequency ablation neurectomy
Some ablations that have been previously performed laparoscopically are also now offered via the pulsed radiofrequency technique. Pulsed radiofrequency ablation relies on delivering an electrical field specifically to neural tissue in order to damage it while minimizing injury to the surrounding area. For example, this technique has been used in patients with chronic shoulder pain as a way to perform a neurectomy of the suprascapular nerve with less risk of damage to nearby muscles within the rotator cuff. There is still a lack of evidence directly comparing the efficacy and safety of this technique compared to the traditional laparoscopic method, but there is evidence that it improves range of motion and pain compared to placebo or sham surgery.

Use in horses

Neurectomy is also used in equine medicine, primarily for cases of persistent lameness that is non-responsive to other forms of treatment. It is most commonly used for animals with navicular syndrome and suspensory ligament desmitis.

References

Further reading
 Surgical treatment of Ménière's disease.
 
 
 
 
 

Neurosurgery
Pain management